Francis Marion Griffith (August 21, 1849 – February 8, 1927) was an American educator and politician who served four terms as a U.S. Representative from Indiana from 1897 to 1905.

Biography 
Born in Moorefield, Indiana, Griffith attended the country schools of the county, the high school in Vevay, Indiana, and Franklin College, Franklin, Indiana.
He taught school.
He was appointed school superintendent of Switzerland County in 1873.
He studied law.
He was admitted to the bar in 1875 and commenced practice in Vevay.
County treasurer 1875-1877.
He served as delegate to the Democratic National Convention in 1880.
He served as member of the State senate 1886-1894 and served as Acting Lieutenant Governor 1891-1894.
He was an unsuccessful candidate for attorney general of Indiana in 1894.

Congress 
Griffith was elected as a Democrat to the Fifty-fifth Congress to fill the vacancy caused by the death of William S. Holman.
He was reelected to the Fifty-sixth, Fifty-seventh, and Fifty-eighth Congresses and served from December 6, 1897, to March 3, 1905.
He declined to be a candidate for renomination in 1904.

Later career and death 
He resumed the practice of law in Vevay, Indiana.
City attorney 1912-1916.
He served as judge of the circuit court of the fifth judicial district 1916-1922.
He again engaged in the practice of his profession.

He died in Vevay, Indiana, February 8, 1927.
He was interred in Vevay Cemetery.

References

1849 births
1927 deaths
People from Switzerland County, Indiana
American people of Welsh descent
Indiana lawyers
Franklin College (Indiana) alumni
Democratic Party members of the United States House of Representatives from Indiana
People from Vevay, Indiana
19th-century American lawyers